David Lindsay, 1st Duke of Montrose (144025 December 1495) was a Scottish nobleman.

He was the son of Alexander Lindsay, 4th Earl of Crawford, and inherited the Earldom of Crawford on his father's death in 1453. During his political career he held the posts of Lord High Admiral of Scotland, Master of the Royal Household, Great Chamberlain and Justiciar. He went frequently as an ambassador to England.

In 1488, he was created Duke of Montrose, the first Scotsman not of royal blood to be granted a Dukedom. Lindsay had won the favour of James III, by remaining loyal to the king during the rebellion of his son Prince James. Lindsay was deprived of his dukedom by James IV when he acceded to the throne later that year, but it was restored in 1489 for life only. On his death in 1495 the title, therefore, became extinct, although the Earldom continues to this day.

Family
He married Elizabeth Hamilton, daughter of James Hamilton, 1st Lord Hamilton in 1459. They had three children before divorcing in the 1480s.

Alexander Lindsay, Master of Crawford (148516 September 1489)
Elizabeth Lindsay (born 1495)
John Lindsay, 6th Earl of Crawford (c. 1495–1513)

Arms

References

thepeerage.com

1440 births
1495 deaths
101
Lord Chamberlains of Scotland
David
Lord High Admirals of Scotland
5